Moulhoule is an administrative district in the Obock Region of Djibouti.

See also 

 Districts of Djibouti

References 

Districts of Djibouti